The 2019–20 Slovak 1. Liga season was the 27th season of the Slovak 1. Liga, the second level of ice hockey in Slovakia.

The season was ended prematurely due to the COVID-19 pandemic in Slovakia.

Regular season

Standings
Each team played 36 games, playing each of the other nine teams fourth times. At the end of the regular season, the team that finished with the most points was crowned the league champion. Each 1HL team played two matches with SR 18 (1x at home and 1x outside) to support the preparation of the SR team for MS U18, I. div. sk. A 2020.

Group 1–6

Group 7–10

Playoffs
Eight teams qualify for the playoffs. The playoffs were cancelled as a result of the COVID-19 pandemic in Slovakia.

Bracket

Quarter-finals

References

External links
Official website

Slovak 1. Liga seasons
Slovakia
Slovakia
2019–20 in Slovak ice hockey leagues
Slovak 1. Liga season